For the Love of Ray J is a dating show on VH1 featuring hip hop singer Ray J. The program has a format similar to Flavor of Love, I Love New York, and Rock of Love.  In reference to the series, Ray J said:

The show ended right before the spin-off Family Business which stars Ray and his sister Brandy. Ray J called the show "a learning experience."

Season 1

The show, which premiered on February 2, 2009, follows Ray J and a group of 14 female contestants. The winner was Cocktail (Joanna Hernandez).

Season 2

A second season premiered on November 2, 2009, with a group of 19 female contestants. The winner was 32 year-old Mz. Berry (Connie Deveaux).

Airing of the show

References

2009 American television series debuts
2000s American reality television series
VH1 original programming
American dating and relationship reality television series
African-American reality television series
Television series by 51 Minds Entertainment
The Surreal Life spinoffs
2010s American reality television series
American television spin-offs
Reality television spin-offs
English-language television shows
2010 American television series endings

de:For the Love of Ray J